Dazan may refer to:
 Dazan, Kerman